Russell Grant Hathaway (January 14, 1896 – August 19, 1988) was a professional American football player who played 8 seasons in the early National Football League for the  Muncie Flyers, Dayton Triangles, Pottsville Maroons and Buffalo Bisons. A native of Terre Haute, Indiana, Hathaway attended Indiana University. In November 1917 Hathaway made a 27-yard field goal early in the fourth quarter for the Hoosiers only points that game. However, it was the first score ever made against Ohio State that season.

Hathaway made his National Football League debut in 1920 with the Muncie Flyers. In 1922, Hathaway led the NFL with 9 extra points. Also in 1922 he helped the Canton Bulldogs win the 1922 NFL Championship. In 1925 he and the Pottsville Maroons won the 1925 NFL Championship, before the title was stripped from the team due to a still-disputed rules violation. He later said that during his time with Pottsville, he was receiving $100 for playing in just one game, while the local miners working there did not make that in a month.

References

Football Historian: Leading Scorers-1922

Notes

Players of American football from Indiana
Canton Bulldogs players
Buffalo Bisons (NFL) players
Dayton Triangles players
Indiana Hoosiers football players
Muncie Flyers players
Pottsville Maroons players
Sportspeople from Terre Haute, Indiana
1896 births
1988 deaths